Timothy IV (died 7 February 535) was the Patriarch of Alexandria from 517. He is considered the 32nd Pope of the Coptic Orthodox Church as Timothy III, since the Copts do not recognize the third Timothy, Timothy Salophakiolos.

Notes

References

 

|-

|-

6th-century Popes and Patriarchs of Alexandria
535 deaths
Year of birth unknown